Leptocroca xyrias is a species of moth in the family Oecophoridae. The taxonomy of this species is in need of revision and L. xyrias likely belongs to a separate genus. It is endemic to New Zealand. It has been classified as Data Deficient by the Department of Conservation.

Taxonomy
This species was described by Edward Meyrick in 1931 from a specimen collected at "Blackmillar" (Black Miller Stream) at Kikoura by Stewart Lindsay in December. George Hudson discussed and illustrated this species in his 1939 publication A supplement to the Butterflies and Moths of New Zealand. The genus level classification of this species is regarded as unsatisfactory. As such the species is also known as Leptocroca (s.l.) xyrias. The holotype specimen is held at the Canterbury Museum.

Description
Meyrick described the species as follows:

Distribution
This species is endemic to New Zealand. It is only known from its collection site in Kaikoura.

Biology and behaviour 
This species is on the wing in December.

Conservation status
This species has been classified as having the "Data Deficient" conservation status under the New Zealand Threat Classification System.

References

External links
Image of holotype specimen

Moths described in 1931
Oecophoridae
Endemic fauna of New Zealand
Taxa named by Edward Meyrick
Moths of New Zealand
Endemic moths of New Zealand